Methylene green is a heterocyclic aromatic chemical compound similar to methylene blue. It is used as a dye.  It functions as a visible light-activated photocatalyst in organic synthesis.

References

External links 
 methylene green (at stainsfile)

Histology
Thiazine dyes
Phenothiazines
Chlorides